Nelly Beatriz Bonnet (born Nelly Beatris Auchter Bonnet; 11 December 1930 – 19 February 2020) was an Argentine film and television actress and comedian.

Biography
Beatriz Bonnet was born in Gualeguay, Entre Ríos on 11 December 1930 to Mariana Amelia Bonnet, a single mother. Mariana's father was Ernest Bonnet, an English immigrant man.

At 15, Bonnet married a man named López Verde, but the couple split a year later. She moved to Buenos Aires, where she studied dance, singing, and acting. While working at a candy shop, Bonnet was recruited by Pedro R. Bravo to act in Mansedumbre, the first film to be shot in Tucumán Province. In mid-1951, she joined the staff of the Cinematographic Institute of the National University of Tucumán, at that time being funded by the Argentine government.

Bonnet entered the Institute of Modern Art in Buenos Aires and was hired by theatre director  to perform in comedies in the Astral Theater.

On television, Bonnet made her debut performing in operettas on Televisión Pública Argentina's Channel 7. She was the replacement actress for Rosita Quintana in a production My Fair Lady, performing so well in one day that the audience cheered for her and indefinitely replaced Quintana. Bonnet would also play in TV musical comedies such as La dama del Maxim's, Descalzos en el parque, and Mame.

Filmography

References

External links

1930 births
2020 deaths
Argentine film actresses
Argentine stage actresses
Argentine television actresses
Argentine vedettes
Argentine people of English descent
Argentine people of German descent
People from Gualeguay Department